Yisroel Moshe Dushinsky (December 22, 1921 – March 26, 2003) also known as the Maharim, was the second Rebbe of the Dushinsky Hasidic dynasty of Jerusalem, Israel. He assumed the leadership of the Hasidut at the age of 28 upon the death of his father, Rabbi Yosef Tzvi Dushinsky, founder of the dynasty. He was also a member of the rabbinical court of the Edah HaChareidis for over 40 years, completing his tenure as the seventh chief rabbi of the Edah HaChareidis from 1996 to 2003.

Early life

Yisroel Moshe Dushinsky was the only child of Rabbi Yosef Tzvi Dushinsky and his second wife, Esther Neuhaus. His father was over 50 years old at the time of his birth. Yisrael Moshe was born in Chust, Ukraine, shortly after his father began serving as Rav of that city. He was named after his paternal grandfather, Yisroel, and his great uncle, Rabbi Moshe Schick (the Maharam Schick).

His father was very attached to him and brought him along when he visited Torah leaders of the era. During Adar 1932, the ten-year-old Yisroel Moshe accompanied his father on a visit to Mandatory Palestine, where they brought mishloach manot to the Jerusalem sage, Rabbi Yosef Chaim Sonnenfeld, who was on his deathbed.

The next year, Yisroel Moshe, his parents, and 25 of his father's students immigrated to Mandatory Palestine, arriving in the port of Jaffa on the ship Italia on August 28, 1933. Yisroel Moshe attended Talmud Torah Shomrei Hachomos. After his bar mitzvah, he began studying at his father's yeshiva, Yeshiva Beis Yosef Tzvi, which the latter had established on Shmuel HaNavi Street in Jerusalem. He later studied for rabbinical ordination under Rabbi Hanoch Padwa and Rabbi Eliezer Brand.

He married the daughter of Rabbi Dovid Yehoshua Gross. The couple had two sons, Yosef Tzvi and Mordechai Yehuda, and two daughters.

Rosh yeshiva and rabbinical leader
After his marriage, his father asked him to begin delivering shiurim (Torah lectures) in the yeshiva. He was 28 years old when his father died in 1948. He took over the administration of the yeshiva and built it into a large Torah institution enrolling thousands of students. Every day after the conclusion of the morning prayers, still wearing tallit and tefillin, he would deliver a shiur on the Shulchan Arukh and its commentaries.

Following his father's death, he was also appointed to the  rabbinical court. In 1967 he became a regular member of the court, a position he held for over 40 years. In 1989 he was appointed Ravad (Rav Av Beit Din), and in 1996, Gaavad (Gaon Av Beit Din, or Chief Rabbi) of the Edah HaChareidis. He was the seventh chief rabbi in that organization's history. On a day that the court adjudicated a get (divorce) or chalitza (ceremony allowing a childless widow to remarry), he would fast.

He was widely respected for his Torah knowledge, refined character, and caring personality.

Death and legacy

Dushinsky suffered from ill health during his final years and underwent several surgeries. In February 2003 his health declined further and he was hospitalized. He was unable to attend the wedding of his grandson, son of Rabbi Mordechai Yehuda, on March 25; he died the next morning at 3:15 am in the presence of family and close students.

He was buried next to his father in the Shaare Zedek Cemetery in Jerusalem. This cemetery had been opened as a temporary burial ground during the 1948 Arab-Israeli war; most of the graves had been moved to other, permanent cemeteries in the early 1950s. However, the grave of his father, who had died at the old Shaare Zedek Hospital in 1948, had not been moved. Since the cemetery had long been closed to burials, Dushinsky was forced to pay a huge sum of money for the right to be buried next to his father.

At the funeral, it was announced that his son, Yosef Tzvi, would succeed him as Grand Rabbi and head of the Dushinsky yeshiva. Rabbi Yitzchok Tuvia Weiss succeeded him as chief rabbi of the Edah HaChareidis.

His Torah writings were published under the title Toras Maharim.

Rebbes of Dushinsky
Rabbi Yosef Tzvi Dushinsky (1867–1948)
Rabbi Yisroel Moshe Dushinsky (1921–2003), son of Yosef Tzvi Dushinsky
Rabbi Yosef Tzvi Dushinsky, son of Yisroel Moshe Dushinsky

References

Sources

External links
HaGaon HaRav Yisrael Moshe Dushinsky zt"l attending wedding of his grandson (2000 video)

Rebbes of Dushinsky
Rabbis of the Edah HaChareidis
20th-century rabbis in Jerusalem
21st-century rabbis in Jerusalem
People from Khust
1921 births
2003 deaths
Israeli Hasidic rabbis
Ukrainian emigrants to Israel